Ardoin may refer to:

Amédé Ardoin (1898–1942), American Creole musician
Danny Ardoin, American baseball player
John Ardoin (1935–2001) American music critic
Ronald Ardoin, American jockey
Chris Ardoin, American zydeco accordionist
Alphonse "Bois Sec" Ardoin (1915–2007), American Cajun accordionist
Kyle Ardoin, Secretary of State of Louisiana